The 1982 Urakawa earthquake was a  6.9 earthquake that struck off the coast of Urakawa, Japan on 11:32 (JST), March 21, 1982. The earthquake was the largest earthquake in the history of the region. The earthquake caused 167 injuries and damage in Tomakomai and Sapporo.

Tectonic setting
Hokkaido is situated on the Okhotsk Plate in between two main zones of seismicity. To the west, there is a convergent plate boundary with the Amurian Plate. To the east, there exists a subduction zone where the Pacific Plate subducts underneath the Okhotsk. This is accommodated by slip along the Kuril-Kamchatka Trench and the Japan Trench. This earthquake struck as the result of thrust faulting in an area of compression known as the Hidaka Collision Zone. The same tectonic process, caused by the collision between the Eurasian Plate and the Kuril fore-arc uplifts the Hidaka Mountains.

Earthquake
At 2:32 UTC or 11:32 local time on the 21st of March, a large earthquake struck off the shore of southern Hokkaido. The  6.9 earthquake caused shaking that reached a maximum Japan Meteorological Agency seismic intensity scale Shindo of 6- and a Modified Mercalli intensity (MMI) of X (Extreme).

Tsunami
 
Tsunami from the earthquake was observed around Hokkaido, with varying run-up heights. The observations at Hachinohe and Hiroo were much higher than models predicted, however this may be due to the models not taking into account more local topography that could influence wave heights.

References 

Sources

External links

1982年浦河沖地震港湾被害報告 - 港湾空港技術研究所
1982年3月21日浦河沖地震 - 北海道大学 (地震予知連絡会会報 第28巻)

March 1982 events in Asia
1982 in Japan
Earthquakes in Japan
1982 earthquakes
1982 disasters in Japan